Results from Norwegian football in 1922.

Class A of local association leagues
Class A of local association leagues (kretsserier) is the predecessor of a national league competition.

1Buskerud local association split into Drammen og omegn and Øvre Buskerud.
2Telemark local association split into Grenland and Øvre Telemark.

Norwegian Cup

Second round

|}

Third round
Aalesund - Rollon 5-1

Brage - Kvik (Trondhjem) 0-2

Stavanger IF - Brodd 5-1

Donn - Larvik Turn 0-2

Drafn - Storm 1-0

Fram (Larvik) - Sarpsborg 0-2

Fredrikstad - Lillestrøm 8-1

Gjøvik/Lyn - Freidig 5-3

Trygg - Kvik (Fredrikshald) 2-9

Moss - Skotfoss 2-0

Odd - Ready 4-3

Strømsgodset - Ørn 2-3 (extra time)

Kvik (Trondhjem) - Tryggkameratene 7-0

Brann, Frigg, Lyn and Mercantile had a walkover.

Fourth round
Aalesund - Drafn 0-3

Larvik Turn - Brann 3-1

Kvik (Trondhjem) - Fredrikstad 3-1

Frigg - Moss 0-3

Stavanger IF - Kvik (Fredrikshald) 1-4

Ørn - Gjøvik/Lyn 3-0

Sarpsborg - Lyn 2-1

Mercantile - Odd 1-4

Quarter-finals
Ørn - Drafn 4-2
Kvik (Trondhjem) - Kvik (Fredrikshald) 3-5
Odd - Larvik Turn 2-1
Sarpsborg - Moss 0-1

Semi-finals
Moss - Kvik (Fredrikshald) 0-1 
Ørn - Odd 1-2

Final
October 15: Odd - Kvik (Fredrikshald) 5-1

National team

Sources:

References

 
Seasons in Norwegian football
, Norwegian